Polygala longicaulis, the longstem milkwort, is a species of flowering plant in the milkwort family (Polygalaceae). It is an annual dicot that is native to the Americas.

References

longicaulis
Flora of South America